Martin John Millett,  (born 30 September 1955) is a British archaeologist and academic. From 2001 to 2022, he was the Laurence Professor of Classical Archaeology at the University of Cambridge and a professorial fellow of Fitzwilliam College, Cambridge. Since 2021, he has been president of the Society of Antiquaries of London.

Early life
Millett was born on 30 September 1955. He was educated at Weydon County Secondary School, a state school in Wrecclesham, Farnham, and Farnham College, a sixth form college in Farnham, Surrey. He went on to study at the Institute of Archaeology, University College London, graduating Bachelor of Arts (BA). He then undertook postgraduate studies at Merton College, Oxford, completing his Doctor of Philosophy (DPhil) degree in 1980. His doctoral thesis was titled A comparative study of some contemporaneous pottery assemblages from Roman Britain.

Academic career
Millett was assistant curator of archaeology at the Hampshire County Museums from 1980 to 1981. He then began his academic career, and joined Durham University in 1981. He was a lecturer from 1981 to 1991, and senior lecturer from 1991 to 1995. He was Professor of Archaeology between 1995 and 1998.

Millett then moved to the University of Southampton where he was Professor of Archaeology from 1999 to 2001. In 2001, he joined the University of Cambridge as the Laurence Professor of Classical Archaeology. The appointment was accompanied by a Fellowship of Fitzwilliam College, Cambridge. In 2012, he was appointed head of the School of Arts and Humanities at Cambridge.

Millett is an archaeologist who excavates a Roman-period site in Yorkshire (with Peter Halkon), directs the Roman Towns Project (with Simon Keay and the British School at Rome), and directs the Greek Colonization and Archaeology of European Development project. Millett has profoundly changed Romano-British archaeology by implementing and calling for new approaches to the excavated materials.

Outside his university work Millett holds a number of appointments. He is a vice-president of the British Academy with responsibility for the British Academy Sponsored Institutes and Societies. He has held three senior positions at the Society of Antiquaries of London: he was director from 2001 to 2007, treasurer from 2007 to 2011, and its president since 2021.

Honours
On 3 May 1984, Millett was elected Fellow of the Society of Antiquaries of London (FSA). In 2006, he was elected Fellow of the British Academy (FBA).

Select bibliography
1990 The Romanization of Britain: an essay in archaeological interpretation  (Cambridge: Cambridge University Press) (Paperback edition issued 1992)
1995 Roman Britain (UK; English Heritage/Batsford) (Second edition 2005)
1995 (with J. M. Carreté and S. J. Keay) A Roman Provincial Capital and its Hinterland: the survey of the territory of Tarragona, 1985-1990 (Ann Arbor, Michigan: Journal of Roman Archaeology Supplementary Series no. 15)
1995 (edited with J. Metzler, N. Roymans and J. Slofstra) Integration in the Early Roman West: the role of culture and ideology (Dossiers d'Archéologie du Musée National d'Histoire et d'Art IV, Luxembourg)
1999 (with P. Halkon) Rural Settlement and Industry: studies in the Iron Age and Roman archaeology of lowland East Yorkshire (Yorkshire Archaeological Society Roman Antiquities Section monograph no. 4)
2001 (edited with J. Pearce and M. Struck) Burial Practice in the Roman World: contextual studies (Oxford: Oxbow Books)
2001 (edited with S. T. James) Britons and Romans: advancing an archaeological agenda (York: Council for British Archaeology Research Report 125)
In press Shiptonthorpe, East Yorkshire: archaeological studies of a Romano-British roadside settlement (Yorkshire Archaeological Society Roman Antiquities Section monograph)
2005 (with S. Keay, L. Paroli, and K. Strutt) Portus: An Archaeological Survey of the Port of Imperial Rome (British School at Rome Monograph)Right.

References

External links
 Museum of Classical Archaeology biography
 British Academy biography
 Faculty biography

Living people
1955 births
Alumni of Merton College, Oxford
Fellows of Fitzwilliam College, Cambridge
Academics of Durham University
British archaeologists
Fellows of the British Academy
Fellows of the Society of Antiquaries of London
Laurence Professors of Classical Archaeology
Alumni of University College London
Academics of the University of Southampton